Erato was a Bosnian R&B duo consisting of Aida Jašarević and Dalal Midhat. The band began with five girls but after three members quit due to lack of singing ability, the band became a duo with Jašarević and Midhat continuing on. The band has released two albums; Backstage (2003) and Make Up (2005).   
 
The duo's name comes from the muse.

In October 2008, the duo reached the Bosnian Top 10 with "Putujemo Snovima", a track that featured Croatian singer Jacques Houdek.

References

Pop music duos
Contemporary R&B duos
Bosnia and Herzegovina musical groups
Hayat Production artists